Whitechapel and St George's was a parliamentary constituency in east London, which returned one Member of Parliament (MP) to the House of Commons of the Parliament of the United Kingdom.

It was created for the 1918 general election, largely replacing the old Stepney constituency. It was abolished for the 1950 general election.

Boundaries

The constituency was a division of the Metropolitan Borough of Stepney in the East End of London. It comprised the local government wards of Mile End New Town, St George-in-the-East North, St George-in-the-East South, Shadwell, Spitalfields East, Spitalfields West, Tower, Whitechapel Middle, and Whitechapel South.

In 1950 the seat was one of three which were combined to form a single Stepney constituency, covering the whole of the Metropolitan Borough.

In 1965 the area became part of the London Borough of Tower Hamlets and Greater London.

Members of Parliament

Election results

Elections in the 1940s

Elections in the 1930s

Elections in the 1920s

Elections in the 1910s

References 

 Boundaries of Parliamentary Constituencies 1885-1972, compiled and edited by F.W.S. Craig (Parliamentary Reference Publications 1972)
 British Parliamentary Election Results 1918-1949, compiled and edited by F.W.S. Craig (Macmillan Press, revised edition 1977)

Parliamentary constituencies in London (historic)
Constituencies of the Parliament of the United Kingdom established in 1918
Constituencies of the Parliament of the United Kingdom disestablished in 1950
Politics of the London Borough of Tower Hamlets
Whitechapel